At the end of each regular season, the American Athletic Conference names major award winners in baseball. Currently, it names a Coach, Pitcher, Player, and Freshman of the Year. The selections are determined by a vote of the conference's coaches at the end of each regular season. The awards were first given out in 2014, the conference's first season of competition.

Coach of the Year
In 2014, UCF head coach Terry Rooney was chosen as the conference's best coach. In the regular season, UCF went 34-22 (17-7 American) to finish second in the conference.

Winners by season
Below is a table of the award's winners.

Winners by school
The following is a table of the schools whose coaches have won the award, along with the year each school joined the conference, the number of times it has won the award, and the years in which it has done so.

Pitcher of the Year
In 2014, UCF's Eric Skoglund was chosen as the conference's best pitcher. In the regular season, the junior went 9-2 with a 2.04 ERA and 92 strikeouts.  After the season, he was selected in the third round of the 2014 MLB Draft by the Kansas City Royals.

Winners by season
Below is a table of the award's winners.

Winners by school
The following is a table of the schools whose players have won the award, along with the number of times it has won the award, and the years in which it has done so.

Player of the Year
In 2014, Jeff Gardner was chosen as the conference's best player. Gardner had been selected as the Preseason Player of the Year, and in the regular season, he led the conference in slugging percentage, runs batted in, and total bases. After the season, he was selected by the Washington Nationals in the 8th round of the 2014 MLB Draft.

Winners by season
Below is a table of the award's winners.

Winners by school
The following is a table of the schools whose players have won the award, along with the number of times it has won the award, and the years in which it has done so.

Newcomer Pitcher of the Year
In 2014, the Newcomer Pitcher of the Year award was shared by Houston pitcher Andrew Lantrip and Rutgers pitcher Gaby Rosa. Lantrip, as a midweek starter, went 5-0 with a 1.64 ERA in the regular season; Rosa went 6-2 with a 2.28 ERA.  In the summer of 2014, Lantrip played for the California Collegiate League's Santa Barbara Foresters, and Rosa played for the Staten Island Tide of the Atlantic Collegiate Baseball League.

Winners by season
Below is a table of the award's winners.

Winners by school
The following is a table of the schools whose players have won the award, along with the year each school joined the conference, the number of times it has won the award, and the years in which it has done so.

Newcomer Position Player of the Year

Winners by season
Below is a table of the Newcomer Position Player of the Year award's winners.

Winners by school
The following is a table of the schools whose coaches have won the award, along with the year each school joined the conference, the number of times it has won the award, and the years in which it has done so.

References

External links

American Athletic Conference baseball
College baseball conference trophies and awards in the United States
NCAA Division I baseball conference coaches of the year
NCAA Division I baseball conference players of the year
NCAA Division I baseball conference freshmen of the year